Jan Van den Bergh (born 2 October 1994) is a Belgian footballer who plays as a centre back for Beerschot in the Belgian First Division B.

Club career
Jan Van den Bergh started his career with KSK Heist. In 2020, Van den Bergh was loaned to Oud-Heverlee Leuven for six months, scoring a goal in each of his first two appearances, the second goal a spectacular overhead kick.

References

1994 births
Living people
Association football central defenders
Belgian footballers
Lierse S.K. players
K.V.C. Westerlo players
K.S.K. Heist players
K Beerschot VA players
K.A.A. Gent players
Oud-Heverlee Leuven players
Belgian Pro League players
Challenger Pro League players
People from Bonheiden
Footballers from Antwerp Province